Louis Auguste Carrier (May 24, 1858 – March 10, 1928) was a Canadian politician.

Born in Lévis, Canada East, the son of Antoine Carrier and Helen Sheppard, Carrier was educated at the college of Levis, the Quebec High School and the College of Poughkeepsie. In 1883, he was appointed a Director of the Quebec Central Railway. He was first elected to the House of Commons of Canada for the electoral division of Lévis in a by-election held in 1905. A Liberal, he was re-elected in 1908. He did not run in 1911.

References
 
 The Canadian Parliament; biographical sketches and photo-engravures of the senators and members of the House of Commons of Canada. Being the tenth Parliament, elected November 3, 1904

1858 births
1928 deaths
Liberal Party of Canada MPs
Members of the House of Commons of Canada from Quebec